Klešić, Klesic is a Serbo-Croatian surname. Notable people with the surname include:

 Michael Klesic (born 1975), American actor

Serbian surnames
Croatian surnames